Luigi Sincero (26 March 1870 – 7 February 1936) was a Roman Catholic Cardinal and President of the Pontifical Commission for the Authentic Interpretation of the Code of Canon Law and Secretary of Sacred Congregation for the Oriental Churches, the title of Prefect held by the Popes from 1917 until 1967.

Early life and priesthood
He was born in Trino Vercellese, Piedmont, Italy. He was educated at the Seminary of Vercelli and the Pontifical Gregorian University, Rome. He was ordained in 1892.  He was chosen as the Vice-rector of the Pontifical Lombard Seminary in 1894. He served as a faculty member of the Seminary of Vercelli and canon theologian of its cathedral from 1894 until 1908. He was appointed an auditor of the Roman Rota on 20 October 1908. He was secretary of the Pontifical Commission for the Authentic Interpretation of the Code of Canon Law on 18 October 1917 and Secretary of the Sacred College of Cardinals in 1919. He served as secretary of the conclave of 1922.

Cardinalate
He was made Cardinal-Deacon of S. Giorgio in Velabro in the consistory of 23 May 1923 by Pope Pius XI. Pope Pius appointed Sincero Secretary of the Congregation for the Oriental Churches on 29 January 1927. He opted for the order of cardinal priests and his deaconry was elevated pro hac vice on 17 December 1928.

Episcopate
Pope Pius appointed him titular archbishop of Petra di Palestina on 11 January 1929.  He was Consecrated two days later in the Sistine chapel by Pope Pius XI. He was elected to the order of cardinal bishops, taking the suburbicarian see of Palestrina on 13 March 1933.

Pope Pius appointed him president of the Pontifical Commission for the Codification of the Oriental Canon Law on 23 November 1934, and president of the Pontifical Commission for the Authentic Interpretation of the Code of Canon Law on 12 December 1934.

He died just short of his 66th birthday on 7 February 1936.

References

Books and articles

1870 births
1936 deaths
20th-century Italian cardinals
Cardinal-bishops of Palestrina
Members of the Congregation for the Oriental Churches
Dicastery for Legislative Texts
Pontifical Gregorian University alumni
People from Trino